Templeton is an unincorporated community and a census-designated place in Pine Township, Armstrong County, Pennsylvania, United States.  As of the 2010 census the population was 325.

History
Templeton Station appears in the 1876 Atlas of Armstrong County, Pennsylvania. It is also mentioned in the 1883 History of Armstrong County Pennsylvania.

References

Pittsburgh metropolitan area
Unincorporated communities in Pennsylvania
Unincorporated communities in Armstrong County, Pennsylvania
Census-designated places in Pennsylvania
Census-designated places in Armstrong County, Pennsylvania